Daniel Nestor and Nenad Zimonjić were the defending champions, but decided not to participate together. Nestor partnered Max Mirnyi, while Zimonjić teamed up with Michaël Llodra. Mirnyi and Nestor defeated Zimonjić and Llodra in the semifinals, 7–6(7–4), 7–6(7–5). In the final, they won against Juan Sebastián Cabal and Eduardo Schwank 7–6(7–3), 3–6, 6–4 for their first Grand Slam doubles title as a team.

Seeds

Draw

Finals

Top half

Section 1

Section 2

Bottom half

Section 3

Section 4

References
 Main Draw
2011 French Open – Men's draws and results at the International Tennis Federation

Men's Doubles
French Open - Men's Doubles
French Open by year – Men's doubles